Dextella alleni is a moth of the family Erebidae first described by Michael Fibiger in 2011. It is found in central Thailand.

The wingspan is 10.5–11 mm. The forewings are short and relatively narrow and the ground colour is beige. There are blackish-brown patches basally at the costa and also in the upper medial area and the terminal area. The crosslines are weakly marked and light brown. The terminal line is indicated by blackish-brown interveinal dots. The hindwing ground colour is grey with a well-marked discal spot.

References

Micronoctuini
Moths described in 2011
Taxa named by Michael Fibiger